Maytenus aquifolia, the espinheira-santa, is an endemic tree (sometimes shrub) species endemic to the Atlantic Forest biome in southeastern Brazil,

Distribution
It is native to the regions of Sudeste − in Minas Gerais, Rio de Janeiro and São Paulo states; and of Sul − in Paraná, Santa Catarina and Rio Grande do Sul states.

Uses
It is a medicinal species, being used for treating ulcers and gastritis.

Conservation
Indiscriminate usage is threatening the survival of this species in its natural habitat.

References

aquifolia
Endemic flora of Brazil
Flora of the Atlantic Forest
Flora of Espírito Santo
Flora of Minas Gerais
Flora of Paraná (state)
Flora of Rio de Janeiro (state)
Flora of Rio Grande do Sul
Flora of Santa Catarina (state)
Flora of São Paulo (state)
Medicinal plants of South America
Taxa named by Carl Friedrich Philipp von Martius